Craig Percival (born 5 December 1972) is a male former English international track cyclist.

Cycling career
He represented England in the sprint event, at the 1998 Commonwealth Games in Kuala Lumpur, Malaysia. He also won the British National Keirin Championships title in 1998 and 1999.

Palmarès

References

1972 births
Living people
English male cyclists
English track cyclists
Cyclists at the 1998 Commonwealth Games
Commonwealth Games competitors for England